Kalalake National High school or (KNHS) is a Public-Based school located at 14th St. New Kalalake, Olongapo City, Philippines (near 14th St. gate) and founded on December 23, 1979. KNHS is based on 3 curriculums, which are K-12 curriculum & the Open High School Program.

History
Kalalake National High School was founded in 1979. Due to changes in 2003, such as changing Department of Education, Culture and Sport (DECS) to Department of Education (DepEd), Kalalake High School is converted into Kalalake National High School.

References

Schools in Olongapo
High schools in Zambales